The eradication or abolition of suffering is the concept of using biotechnology to create a permanent absence of involuntary pain and suffering in all sentient beings.

Biology and medicine

The discovery of modern anesthesia in the 19th century was an early breakthrough in the elimination of pain during surgery, but acceptance was not universal. Some medical practitioners at the time believed that anesthesia was an artificial and harmful intervention in the body's natural response to injury. Opposition to anesthesia has since dissipated, however the prospect of eradicating pain raises similar concerns about interfering with life's natural functions.

People who are naturally incapable of feeling pain or unpleasant sensations due to rare conditions like pain asymbolia or congenital insensitivity to pain have been studied to discover the biological and genetic reasons for their pain-free lives. A Scottish woman with a previously unreported genetic mutation in a FAAH pseudogene (dubbed FAAH-OUT) with resultant elevated anandamide levels was reported in 2019 to be immune to anxiety, unable to experience fear, and insensitive to pain. The frequent burns and cuts she had due to her full hypoalgesia healed quicker than average.

In 1990, Medical Hypotheses published an article by L. S. Mancini on the "genetic engineering of a world without pain":

The development of gene editing techniques like CRISPR has raised the prospect that "scientists can identify the causes of certain unusual people's physical superpowers and use gene editing to grant them to others." Geneticist George Church has commented on the potential future of replacing pain with a painless sensory system:

Ethics and philosophy

Ethicists and philosophers in the schools of hedonism and utilitarianism, especially negative utilitarianism, have debated the merits of eradicating suffering. Transhumanist philosopher David Pearce, in The Hedonistic Imperative (1995), argues that the abolition of suffering is both technically feasible and an issue of moral urgency, stating that: "It is predicted that the world's last unpleasant experience will be a precisely dateable event."

The philosopher Nick Bostrom, director of the Future of Humanity Institute, advises a more cautious approach due to pain's function in protecting individuals from harm. However, Bostrom supports the core idea of using biotechnology to get rid of "a huge amount of unnecessary and undeserved suffering." It has also been argued that the eradication of suffering through biotechnology may bring about unwanted consequences, and arguments have been made that transhumanism is not the only philosophy worthy of consideration regarding the question of suffering — many people view suffering as one aspect in a  dualist understanding of psychological and physical functioning, without which pleasure could not exist.

Animal welfare
In 2009, Adam Shriver suggested replacing animals in factory farming with genetically engineered animals with a reduced or absent capacity to suffer and feel pain. Shriver and McConnachie argued that people who wish to improve animal welfare should support gene editing in addition to plant-based diets and cultured meat.

Katrien Devolder and Matthias Eggel proposed gene editing research animals to remove pain and suffering. This would be an intermediate step towards eventually stopping all experimentation on animals and adopting alternatives.

Concerning wild-animal suffering, CRISPR-based gene drives have been suggested as a cost-effective way of spreading benign alleles in sexually reproducing species. To limit gene drives spreading indefinitely (for test programmes, for example), the Sculpting Evolution group at the MIT Media Lab developed a self-exhausting form of CRISPR-based gene drive called a "daisy-chain drive." For potential adverse effects of a gene drive, "[s]everal genetic mechanisms for limiting or eliminating gene drives have been proposed and/or developed, including synthetic resistance, reversal drives, and immunizing reversal drives."

See also
 Antinaturalism
 Appeal to nature
 Biohappiness
 Effective altruism
 Pain in animals
 Suffering-focused ethics
 Transhumanism
 Wild animal suffering

References

Further reading
 
 
 
 
 
 

Animal welfare
Bioethics
Biotechnology
Axiology
Genetic engineering
Genome editing
Pain
Suffering
Transhumanism